The national flag of Benin is a flag consisting of two horizontal yellow and red bands on the fly side and a green vertical band at the hoist.  Adopted in 1959 to replace the French Tricolour, it was the flag of the Republic of Dahomey until 1975, when the People's Republic of Benin was established.  The new regime renamed the country and changed the flag to a green field with a red star in the canton. This version was utilized until multi-party democracy was re-established in 1990, coinciding with the Revolutions of 1989.  The new government promptly restored the original pre-1975 flag.

History
Under French colonial rule over Dahomey, French authorities forbade the colony from having its own regional flag.  This was because they were worried that this could increase nationalistic sentiment and lead to calls for independence.  However, with the rise of the decolonization movement in Africa, the French were obliged to grant limited autonomy to Dahomey as a self-governing republic within the French Community.  This was granted on December 4, 1958, and a search for a national flag began soon after.

The new flag was chosen on November 16, 1959, and remained unchanged when Dahomey became independent less than a year later on August 1, 1960.  In 1972, a coup d'état took place in the country, with the new government aligning itself with Marxist–Leninist ideals.  In order to symbolize the revolutionary change, the country was renamed Benin and a new flag was instituted three years later.  It featured a green field charged with a five-pointed red star in the top-left canton.  The new flag was never adopted by law, however, making it only the de facto flag of Benin.

The green flag remained in place until 1990, when economic problems and the weakening of the Soviet Union's power due to the Revolutions of 1989 culminated in the collapse of the People's Republic of Benin. The original flag from 1959 was reinstated on August 1, 1990.

Design
The colours of the flag carry cultural, political, and regional meanings.  As stated in the national anthem, the green of the flag represent the hope of a new democracy. The red represents the courage of the ancestors, and the yellow is for the treasures of the nation. On a continental level, the yellow, green and red represented the Pan-Africanist movement; the three colours were utilized by the African Democratic Rally, a political party representing the interests of French West Africa in the National Assembly of France at the time of decolonization.  Furthermore, the colours are the same as the ones utilized in the flag of Ethiopia.  This honours the oldest independent country in Africa and the only nation other than Liberia to remain independent during the Scramble for Africa.

Colour scheme

Historical flags

Other flags

Military

Gallery

See also 
 Coat of Arms of Benin
 Pan-African colours

References

External links

Flags introduced in 1959
National symbols of Benin
Flags of Africa
National flags